Datuk Yong Khoon Seng (born 22 December 1941) was the Member of the Parliament of Malaysia for the Stampin constituency in Sarawak, representing the Sarawak United Peoples' Party (SUPP), from 1999 until 2013. He was a Deputy Minister of Works in the ruling Barisan Nasional coalition government.

Yong entered Parliament in 1990 for the seat of Padawan. He was immediately appointed as a Parliamentary Secretary. Before entering politics, he was a pharmacist, graduating from the University of Queensland. He was born in Betong, Sarawak.

However, at the 2013 general election, Yong lost his seat to a Democratic Action Party (DAP) candidate, Julian Tan Kok Ping.

Election results

Honours
  :
  Officer of the Order of the Defender of the Realm (KMN) (1991)
  :
  Commander of the Order of the Star of Hornbill Sarawak (PGBK) - Datuk (2013)

References

Living people
21st-century Malaysian politicians
20th-century Malaysian politicians
Officers of the Order of the Defender of the Realm
Commanders of the Order of the Star of Hornbill Sarawak
1941 births
Malaysian people of Hakka descent
Malaysian politicians of Chinese descent
Members of the Dewan Rakyat
Sarawak United Peoples' Party politicians
University of Queensland alumni
Malaysian pharmacists